The 68th New York Film Critics Circle Awards, honoring the best in film for 2002, were announced on 16 December 2002 and presented on 12 January 2003 by the New York Film Critics Circle.

Winners

Best Actor:
Daniel Day-Lewis – Gangs of New York
Runners-up: Jack Nicholson – About Schmidt and Greg Kinnear – Auto Focus
Best Actress:
Diane Lane – Unfaithful
Runners-up: Julianne Moore – Far from Heaven and Isabelle Huppert – The Piano Teacher (La pianiste)
Best Animated Film:
Spirited Away (Sen to Chihiro no kamikakushi)
Best Cinematography:
Edward Lachman – Far from Heaven
Runners-up: Michael Ballhaus – Gangs of New York and Conrad L. Hall – Road to Perdition
Best Director:
Todd Haynes – Far from Heaven
Runners-up: Pedro Almodóvar – Talk to Her (Hable con ella) and Alexander Payne – About Schmidt
Best Film:
Far from Heaven
Runners-up: About Schmidt and Talk to Her (Hable con ella)
Best First Film:
Dylan Kidd – Roger Dodger 
Runners-up: Rob Marshall – Chicago and Zacharias Kunuk – Atanarjuat: The Fast Runner (Atanarjuat)
Best Foreign Language Film:
Y Tu Mamá También • Mexico/United States
Runners-up: Talk to Her (Hable con ella) • Spain and Time Out (L'emploi du temps) • France
Best Non-Fiction Film:
Standing in the Shadows of Motown
Runners-up: The Kid Stays in the Picture and Bowling for Columbine
Best Screenplay:
Charlie and Donald Kaufman – Adaptation.
Runners-up: Alexander Payne and Jim Taylor – About Schmidt and Dylan Kidd – Roger Dodger
Best Supporting Actor:
Dennis Quaid – Far from Heaven
Runners-up: Chris Cooper – Adaptation. and Willem Dafoe – Auto Focus
Best Supporting Actress:
Patricia Clarkson – Far from Heaven
Runners-up: Parker Posey – Personal Velocity and Hope Davis – About Schmidt
Special Award: 
Kino International for the restoration of Metropolis

References

External links
 2002 Awards

2002
New York Film Critics Circle Awards, 2002
2002 in American cinema
New
New York